is a Japanese judoka.

He began judo at the age of 6.

He won the gold medal in the Lightweight (71 kg) division at the 1995 World Judo Championships.

External links
 

Japanese male judoka
1970 births
Living people
Sportspeople from Fukuoka (city)
20th-century Japanese people
21st-century Japanese people